Life Feels Good is a 2013 Polish drama film directed by Maciej Pieprzyca.

It won the jury, audience and ecumenical prizes at the Montreal World Film Festival.

Plot
It tells the story of Mateusz Rosiński who has cerebral palsy in Poland and his life from the 1980s to 2000s.  It is inspired by true events.

Cast 
 Dawid Ogrodnik - Mateusz
 Kamil Tkacz - young Mateusz
  - Mateusz's mother
 Arkadiusz Jakubik - Mateusz's father
 Anna Nehrebecka - Jola, teacher
 Helena Sujecka - Matylda
 Mikołaj Roznerski - Tomek
 Tymoteusz Marciniak - young Tomek
 Katarzyna Zawadzka - Magda
 Anna Karczmarczyk - Anka
 Agnieszka Kotlarska - Anka's mother
 Janusz Chabior - "Łysy"
 Gabriela Muskała - doctor
 Lech Dyblik - healer
 Dariusz Chojnacki - Matylda's fiancé
 Izabela Dąbrowska - neighbor
 Witold Wieliński - neighbor
 Mirosław Neinert - uncle
 Grażyna Bułka - aunt
 Klaudia Kąca-Jasik - cousin
 Małgorzata Moskalewicz - Tomek's girlfriend
 Bernadetta Komiago - customer
 Marek Kalita - Magda's father
 Teresa Iwko - Magda's stepmother
 Grzegorz Mielczarek - counselor Krzysztof
 Ewa Serwa - head of medical center

Awards

References

External links

2013 films
2013 drama films
Polish drama films